Kampungan is Slank's second album. It was released on December 26, 1991. This album contains classic hits such as Mawar Merah and Terlalu Manis.

First release version of the cover was printed on an iron-on T-shirt transfer paper.

Track listing

Personnel
Slank
Bimbim – drums, backing vocals
Bongky – bass, backing vocals
Pay – lead and rhythm guitar, backing vocals
Indra Q – keyboards, mixing, mastering
Kaka – lead vocals

Additional musicians and production
 Boedi Soesatio – producer, manager, design, photo
 Proyek Q – production
 Program/Virgo Record – distributed
 Jackson Record – studio
 Teddy Riady – sound engineer
 BSP Production – printing
 Oppie Andaresta – backing vocal on "Mawar Merah"
 Irma June – backing vocal on "Mawar Merah"

Slank albums
1991 albums